Trinity Square may refer to:

 Trinity Square (Gateshead), a shopping centre in Gateshead, Tyne & Wear, England
 Trinity Square (Nottingham), a shopping centre in Nottingham, England
 Trinity Square Gardens, a garden square (also known as Tower Hill) north of the Tower of London, England
 Trinity Square (Toronto), a public square in Toronto, Ontario, Canada
 Red Square, in Moscow, Russia, known as Trinity Square in the 17th century